Michael Thomas Gminski (born August 3, 1959) is an American former professional basketball player and a college basketball TV analyst for CBS Sports. In 2003, Gminski, of Polish descent, was inducted into the National Polish American Sports Hall of Fame.

Early career
Gminski played his high school ball for Masuk High School in Monroe, CT, where he graduated in three years. He is considered a pioneer in reclassifying, graduating early to jump start his college basketball career.

College career

From there he played four seasons with the Duke Blue Devils, from 1977 to 1980. He led the team in scoring during his junior and senior years. Gminski was named the ACC Rookie of the Year (tied) in 1977, first team All-ACC three years, 1978, 1979, and 1980, and ACC Player of the Year in 1979. He was also named an AP Second Team All-American in 1979 and 1980, and a UPI First Team All-American in 1979 and Second Team All-American in 1980.

At the time of graduation, he was the Duke career leader in points (2,323), rebounds (1,242), and blocked shots (345). As of early 2020, he is eighth all time in the ACC in points and rebounds. He is sixth in blocked shots all-time in the ACC and second in Duke history. He is also second in Duke career rebounds behind Shelden Williams and fifth in points behind JJ Redick, Johnny Dawkins, Christian Laettner, and Kyle Singler. His jersey number 43 is retired by the Duke men's basketball team. In 2002, Gminski was named to the ACC 50th Anniversary men's basketball team as one of the 50 greatest players in Atlantic Coast Conference history.

NBA career
Gminski was drafted in the first round by the New Jersey Nets of the NBA. He played for the Nets from 1980 to 1988. Gminski played in the Summer Pro League in 1981, where during a game he was elbowed in the back which caused an infection and blood clot. He went on to play with the Philadelphia 76ers, as well as the Charlotte Hornets and Milwaukee Bucks. He wore jersey No 42 throughout his career and only got to wear No 43 (his Duke number) in his final 8 games with the Milwaukee Bucks. He scored 10 points in his final NBA game.

In a remarkable start to the 1990 season, Gminski and teammates made a pact that if the Sixers won 10 in a row, they would each get their ears pierced. When the team pulled off 12 in a row, he, Rick Mahorn and the others were sporting diamond earrings to commemorate the feat.

Gminski was an exceptional free throw shooter, especially compared to other big men (Gminski was listed at ). During his career, he converted over 84% of his attempts.

NBA career statistics

Regular season

|-
| align="left" | 1980–81
| align="left" | New Jersey
| 56 || - || 28.2 || .423 || .000 || .767 || 7.5 || 1.3 || 1.0 || 1.8 || 13.2
|-
| align="left" | 1981–82
| align="left" | New Jersey
| 64 || 6 || 11.6 || .441 || .000 || .822 || 2.9 || 0.6 || 0.3 || 0.8 || 5.2
|-
| align="left" | 1982–83
| align="left" | New Jersey
| 80 || 1 || 15.7 || .500 || .000 || .778 || 4.8 || 0.8 || 0.4 || 1.5 || 7.5
|-
| align="left" | 1983–84
| align="left" | New Jersey
| style="background:#cfecec;"| 82* || 2 || 20.2 || .513 || .000 || .799 || 5.3 || 1.1 || 0.5 || 0.9 || 7.6
|-
| align="left" | 1984–85
| align="left" | New Jersey
| 81 || 54 || 29.9 || .465 || .000 || .841 || 7.8 || 2.0 || 0.5 || 1.1 || 12.8
|-
| align="left" | 1985–86
| align="left" | New Jersey
| 81 || 78 || 31.2 || .517 || .000 || .893 || 8.2 || 1.6 || 0.7 || 0.9 || 16.5
|-
| align="left" | 1986–87
| align="left" | New Jersey
| 72 || 66 || 31.6 || .457 || .000 || .846 || 8.8 || 1.4 || 0.7 || 1.0 || 16.4
|-
| align="left" | 1987–88
| align="left" | New Jersey
| 34 || 34 || 35.1 || .454 || .000 || .861 || 9.4 || 1.6 || 0.8 || 1.0 || 16.9
|-
| align="left" | 1987–88
| align="left" | Philadelphia
| 47 || 47 || 37.6 || .445 || .000 || .938 || 10.5 || 1.8 || 0.8 || 1.8 || 16.9
|-
| align="left" | 1988–89
| align="left" | Philadelphia
| style="background:#cfecec;"| 82* || 82 || 33.4 || .477 || .000 || .871 || 9.4 || 1.7 || 0.6 || 1.3 || 17.2
|-
| align="left" | 1989–90
| align="left" | Philadelphia
| 81 || 81 || 32.8 || .457 || .176 || .821 || 8.5 || 1.6 || 0.5 || 1.3 || 13.7
|-
| align="left" | 1990–91
| align="left" | Philadelphia
| 30 || 29 || 26.4 || .384 || .125 || .841 || 6.7 || 1.1 || 0.5 || 1.1 || 9.1
|-
| align="left" | 1990–91
| align="left" | Charlotte
| 50 || 50 || 28.1 || .473 || .167 || .789 || 7.6 || 1.2 || 0.5 || 0.4 || 11.4
|-
| align="left" | 1991–92
| align="left" | Charlotte
| 35 || 10 || 14.3 || .452 || .333 || .750 || 3.4 || 0.9 || 0.3 || 0.5 || 5.8
|-
| align="left" | 1992–93
| align="left" | Charlotte
| 34 || 0 || 7.4 || .506 || .000 || .900 || 2.5 || 0.2 || 0.0 || 0.3 || 2.7
|-
| align="left" | 1993–94
| align="left" | Charlotte
| 21 || 6 || 12.1 || .392 || .000 || .786 || 2.8 || 0.5 || 0.6 || 0.6 || 3.5
|-
| align="left" | 1993–94
| align="left" | Milwaukee
| 8 || 1 || 6.8 || .208 || .000 || .750 || 1.9 || 0.0 || 0.0 || 0.4 || 1.6
|- class="sortbottom"
| style="text-align:center;" colspan="2"| Career
| 938 || 547 || 25.6 || .465 || .122 || .843 || 6.9 || 1.3 || 0.5 || 1.1 || 11.7
|}

Playoffs

|-
| align="left" | 1981–82
| align="left" | New Jersey
| 1 || - || 10.0 || .667 || .000 || .500 || 2.0 || 0.0 || 0.0 || 0.0 || 5.0
|-
| align="left" | 1982–83
| align="left" | New Jersey
| 2 || - || 14.5 || .667 || .000 || .750 || 4.5 || 0.5 || 0.0 || 2.0 || 7.5
|-
| align="left" | 1983–84
| align="left" | New Jersey
| 11 || - || 20.3 || .580 || .000 || .692 || 5.0 || 0.5 || 0.6 || 1.4 || 8.5
|-
| align="left" | 1984–85
| align="left" | New Jersey
| 3 || 0 || 27.0 || .545 || .000 || 1.000 || 6.3 || 1.3 || 1.0 || 1.7 || 14.0
|-
| align="left" | 1985–86
| align="left" | New Jersey
| 3 || 3 || 36.3 || .372 || .000 || .963 || 10.0 || 1.7 || 1.3 || 0.7 || 19.3
|-
| align="left" | 1988–89
| align="left" | Philadelphia
| 3 || 3 || 39.3 || .396 || .000 || .688 || 7.7 || 0.7 || 0.0 || 2.7 || 16.3
|-
| align="left" | 1989–90
| align="left" | Philadelphia
| 10 || 10 || 34.2 || .487 || .000 || .933 || 5.4 || 1.1 || 0.8 || 2.3 || 12.8
|-
| align="left" | 1992–93
| align="left" | Charlotte
| 2 || 0 || 2.5 || .500 || .000 || .000 || 0.5 || 0.0 || 0.0 || 0.0 || 1.0
|- class="sortbottom"
| style="text-align:center;" colspan="2"| Career
| 35 || 16 || 26.2 || .485 || .000 || .795 || 5.5 || 0.8 || 0.6 || 1.6 || 11.2
|}

See also
 List of NCAA Division I men's basketball players with 2,000 points and 1,000 rebounds

References

External links

1959 births
Living people
All-American college men's basketball players
American men's basketball players
American people of Polish descent
Basketball players from Connecticut
Centers (basketball)
Charlotte Hornets announcers
Charlotte Hornets players
College basketball announcers in the United States
Duke Blue Devils men's basketball players
Milwaukee Bucks players
New Jersey Nets draft picks
New Jersey Nets players
People from Monroe, Connecticut
Philadelphia 76ers players